The pandereta plenera, pandero plenero or plenera, is a handheld frame drum typical of Puerto Rican music.  A group of these drums is commonly used in traditional Puerto Rican plena music. There are three general sizes: primo or requinto (for solos and lead), segundo or seguidor, and tercero or  bajo (for rhythm and bass), although sizes can vary. A fourth type is the pandereta punteador, also used for rhythm.

See also
Drum
Percussion instrument
Plena

References 

 

Membranophones
Puerto Rican musical instruments